James Young (born 1 March 1891) was a Scottish footballer who played for Lochgelly United, Raith Rovers, Kilmarnock, Celtic, Rangers and Dumbarton.

Young played one game for Celtic on 9 February 1918 while on loan from Lochgelly United against Hearts at Celtic Park, as the Bhoys ran out 3-0 victors; however Celtic were unwilling to meet Lochgelly's £250 asking price for the player so he did not stay with the club. He signed for Rangers the following week and played in four matches before the end of the season as the Gers won the Scottish Football League title by a point over their Glasgow rivals, but did not feature again, moving on to Dumbarton in January 1919.

See also
Played for Celtic and Rangers

References

1891 births
Scottish footballers
Scottish Junior Football Association players
Scottish Football League players
Year of death missing
Lochgelly United F.C. players
Raith Rovers F.C. players
Kilmarnock F.C. players
Celtic F.C. players
Rangers F.C. players
Dumbarton F.C. players
Association football outside forwards
Glencraig Celtic F.C. players